WCW Mayhem is a professional wrestling video game published by Electronic Arts, based on the American promotion World Championship Wrestling (WCW). The first WCW game produced by EA, it was released for Nintendo 64 and PlayStation in 1999 and for the Game Boy Color the following year.

The game featured several firsts for a wrestling title. For instance, Mayhem was the first game to feature all twelve WCW pay-per-view venues as well as all three major WCW television shows (Nitro, Thunder, and Saturday Night). Mayhem was also the first wrestling game released in the United States to include backstage areas, a feature which would be expanded upon in its sequel, WCW Backstage Assault. It was also one of the first wrestling games to integrate audio commentary provided by Bobby Heenan and Tony Schiavone; although, only Schiavone was included in the N64 version despite some of his lines being addressed directly to Heenan.

Mayhem also featured a Pay-Per-View mode which was unique from other wrestling games, in that the player could enter a code to unlock real-life pay-per-view match lineups; these codes would be given on Monday Nitro broadcasts the week before a pay-per-view. However, this only lasted for three months (ending with the pay-per-view of the same name), as the games' roster was outdated soon after its release, with several of the featured wrestlers leaving the company. The game was partially sponsored by Surge soft drinks at the time of game release.

Gameplay 
The game offers you the chance to play more than 50 wrestlers and create one using the create-a-wrestler feature. It was the first WCW game to not feature the grapple system as seen in previous titles Revenge and World Tour created by AKI/THQ.

Roster 
The in-game roster featured a variety of onscreen talent from WCW. Not all of them were wrestlers as managers, an announcer and other staff were available as playable characters. Most were unlocked via progressing through the 'Quest For The Best' mode, or by cheat code. There were no female characters.

The roster was divided into six sub-rosters: WCW, nWo Hollywood, nWo Wolfpac, Four Horsemen, Cruiserweight, and Hardcore, plus additional sub-rosters for created wrestlers stored on each available Controller Pak. Only people on the Cruiserweight list could compete for the WCW Cruiserweight Championship in Quest For The Best mode. Despite the existence of a Hardcore division, there were no other references to the WCW Hardcore Championship.

The game was noted for having a roster that was quickly out of date. Chris Jericho and Raven had already been making onscreen appearances for rival companies before the game was released. Several people would leave the company just before or within weeks of the release, including Dean Malenko and Eddy Guerrero. Surprisingly, Bobby Blaze and Bobby Eaton featured on the playable roster despite not being currently active in WCW for some time.

While players could play as Sting with his traditional look, there was an unlockable character called 'Wolfpac Sting' that allowed players to use his old look. Similarly, a cheat code allowed players to revert Rey Mysterio, Jr's updated appearance back to his more popular luchador attire. Another cheat code known as "Jobber Billy Kidman" replaced three characters with an unidentified programmer and his two sons.

Hidden within the games audio files are commentary for over a dozen other personalities, as well as most of the programmers.  The known names included Tony Schiavone, Rick Rude, Paul Orndorff, Mike Enos and Ted DiBiase.  This strongly implies that they were going to be included in the game at one stage.

Arenas 
While all of the arenas had the same principal layout, they were all based on WCW televisions shows and pay-per-views. It included both updated and original versions of the Thunder and Monday Night Nitro sets (even though one must be unlocked). All arenas had an opening where wrestlers would enter the area. Wrestlers could also leave via this passageway. If players did this in a match where there was no count out, they could access a back room. There was 13 back rooms in total based on different locations around a standard sports arena, including the car park, ticket office and bathrooms. Each back room had objects that could be used as weapons, and sometimes had another wrestler waiting to ambush the players.

Development 
After failing to match the success of WCW's video games amidst the Monday Night Wars, WCW's main competitor, the World Wrestling Federation (WWF), ended a twelve-year relationship with Acclaim Entertainment by defecting to THQ. Not wishing to share game publishers with its competitor, WCW ended its successful run of THQ titles by partnering with Electronic Arts in 1999.

Mayhem's working title was WCW/nWo Mayhem, as evidenced by early photographs featuring wrestlers wearing shirts with an older Mayhem logo. The game was promoted for months on WCW television, including a counter which appeared on programs such as Monday Nitro and Thunder, counting down the days, hours, minutes, and seconds to Mayhems Nintendo 64 and PlayStation release on September 23, 1999. A clip was even shown of Goldberg's character in a house environment spearing someone through a wall but the move and the house area were not seen in the final game.

A sequel to this game, tentatively titled WCW Mayhem 2, was planned for release on the PlayStation 2 in 2001. The game was slated to be developed by Aki Corporation, the developers of acclaimed WCW and WWF titles for the Nintendo 64. However, due to WCW being purchased by the WWF, the game's development was canceled. Aki would instead develop Def Jam Vendetta for the next generation of consoles. Work on WCW Mayhem 2 began mainly in response to the failure of WCW Backstage Assault.

Reception

The PlayStation version received above-average reviews, and the Nintendo 64 version received average reviews, while the Game Boy Color version received below-average reviews, according to the review aggregation website GameRankings. However, Daniel Erickson of NextGen said of the Nintendo 64 version, "If this game existed in a total vacuum, it would barely pass – in the face of Wrestlemania 2000 and even [WWF] Attitude, it's simply inexcusable."

The Freshman of GamePro said of the Nintendo 64 version in one review, "If you're a fan of the action and the 'showbiz' of wrestling, then it looks like you're up for some Mayhem." In another review, The Rookie called the same console version "a fine game if you're a fan of the league. It's also a good place to start if you're a newbie. If you want more depth and something with a more sim-like feel, however, stick to WWF Attitude." In one review, The D-Pad Destroyer said of the PlayStation version, "Wrestling fans, you have a choice here. If you're into the art and the moves, then WCW Mayhem may leave you dazed by its simplicity. But if you watch wrestling for the show and the action, then Mayhem is right up your alley. It's fast, simple and action-packed, and it's the best bodyslam on the Playstation." However, in another review, Four-Eyed Dragon called the same console version "a solid wrestling title despite its mediocre looks and uneven gameplay. While not exactly up to par with Attitude, the game can still go one-on-one with the great one."

The game was criticized for its poor collision detection and lack of diverse movesets. It was, however, praised for its smooth and detailed looking graphics and the sound was also highly praised.

Notes

See also

List of licensed wrestling video games

References

External links
 
 

1999 video games
Electronic Arts games
Multiplayer and single-player video games
Game Boy Color games
Nintendo 64 games
PlayStation (console) games
World Championship Wrestling video games
WCW Mayhem
Professional wrestling games
Video games developed in the United States
Kodiak Interactive games